In number theory, Ostrowski's theorem, due to Alexander Ostrowski (1916), states that every non-trivial absolute value on the rational numbers  is equivalent to either the usual real absolute value or a -adic absolute value.

Definitions 
Raising an absolute value to a power less than 1 always results in another absolute value.

 

The trivial absolute value on any field K is defined to be

 

The real absolute value on the rationals  is the standard absolute value on the reals, defined to be

 

This is sometimes written with a subscript 1 instead of infinity.

Proof 

Consider a non-trivial absolute value on the rationals . We consider two cases:

 

It suffices for us to consider the valuation of integers greater than one.

 

and for negative rationals

Case (1) 
It therefore follows that .

Express  in base :

 
Hence
  so 

Then we see, by the properties of an absolute value:

 

 

Therefore,

 

 

which implies

 

As a result, the initial condition above must be satisfied by any .

Thus for any choice of natural numbers , we get

 

i.e.

 

By symmetry, this inequality is an equality.

As per the above remarks, we easily see that  for all rationals, thus demonstrating equivalence to the real absolute value.

Case (2) 
As this valuation is non-trivial, there must be a natural number for which  Factoring into primes:

 

yields that there exists  such that  We claim that in fact this is so for only one.

Suppose per contra that  are distinct primes with absolute value less than 1. First, let  be such that .

 

a contradiction.

Letting

 

we see that for general positive naturals

 

As per the above remarks, we see that  for all rationals, implying that the absolute value is equivalent to the -adic one. 

Another Ostrowski's theorem 
Another theorem states that any field, complete with respect to an Archimedean absolute value, is (algebraically and topologically) isomorphic to either the real numbers or the complex numbers. This is sometimes also referred to as Ostrowski's theorem.

See also 
 Valuation (algebra)

References 

 

Theorems in algebraic number theory